Üçdamlar, formerly and still informally called Kandevir, is a village in the Oğuzeli District, Gaziantep Province, Turkey. The village is inhabited by Turkmens from various tribes, including Elbegli and Barak, as well as Abdals of the Kurular tribe.

References

Villages in Oğuzeli District